Statistical and Applied Mathematical Sciences Institute (SAMSI) is an applied mathematics and statistics research organization based in Research Triangle Park, North Carolina.  It is funded by the National Science Foundation, and is partnered with Duke University, North Carolina State University, the University of North Carolina at Chapel Hill, and the National Institute of Statistical Sciences.

SAMSI was founded in 2002.  In 2012, the National Science Foundation renewed SAMSI's funding for an additional five years.  SAMSI is offering programs in bioinformatics and statistical ecology in 2014–15.

SAMSI closed its doors in August of 2021, after 19 years of work.

References

National Science Foundation mathematical sciences institutes
2002 establishments in North Carolina